USS Bombard (AM-151) was an  built for the United States Navy during World War II and in commission from 1944 to 1945. In 1945, she was transferred to the Soviet Union, serving after that in the Soviet Navy as T-336.

Construction and commissioning
Originally classified as a "coastal minesweeper," AMc-128, Bombard was reclassified as a "minesweeper," AM-151, on 21 February 1942. She was laid down on 7 December 1942 at Tampa, Florida, by the Tampa Shipbuilding Company, Inc., launched on 23 February 1943, sponsored by Mrs. Vivian Broadwater, and commissioned on 31 May 1944.

Service history

U.S. Navy, World War II, 1944-1945
After shakedown training, Bombard transited the Panama Canal at the end of July 1944. From there, she voyaged directly to Samoa, departing the Panama Canal Zone on 1 August 1944 and arriving at Tutuila on 29 August 1944. On 2 September 1944, she left Tutuila and made stops at Pearl Harbor, Territory of Hawaii, and San Francisco, California, before arriving in the waters of the Territory of Alaska at the end of the first week in November 1944. Minesweeping exercises, patrols, and convoy escort missions kept her busy until the summer of 1945 when, having been selected for transfer to the Soviet Navy in Project Hula – a secret program for the transfer of U.S. Navy ships to the Soviet Navy at Cold Bay, Alaska, in anticipation of the Soviet Union joining the war against Japan – she began familiarization training for her new Soviet crew at Cold Bay.

Soviet Navy, 1945-1963

Following the completion of training for her Soviet crew, Bombard was decommissioned on 19 July 1945 at Cold Bay and transferred to the Soviet Union under Lend-Lease immediately. She soon departed Cold Bay bound for Petropavlovsk-Kamchatsky in the Soviet Union, where she served in the Soviet Far East.

In February 1946, the United States began negotiations for the return of ships loaned to the Soviet Union for use during World War II, and on 8 May 1947, United States Secretary of the Navy James V. Forrestal informed the United States Department of State that the United States Department of the Navy wanted 480 of the 585 combatant ships it had transferred to the Soviet Union for World War II use returned. Deteriorating relations between the two countries as the Cold War broke out led to protracted negotiations over the ships, and by the mid-1950s the U.S. Navy found it too expensive to bring home ships that had become worthless to it anyway. Many ex-American ships were merely administratively "returned" to the United States and instead sold for scrap in the Soviet Union, while the U.S. Navy did not seriously pursue the return of others because it viewed them as no longer worth the cost of recovery. The Soviet Union never returned Bombard to the United States, although the U.S. Navy reclassified her as a "fleet minesweeper" (MSF) and redesignated her MSF-151 on 7 February 1955.

Disposal
The Soviet Navy struck T-336 from its vessel register in 1963. Unaware of her fate, the U.S. Navy kept Bombard on its Naval Vessel Register until finally striking her on 1 January 1983.

References

External links
 NavSource Online: Mine Warfare Vessel Photo Archive - Bombard (MSF 151) - ex-AM-151 - ex-AMc-128

Admirable-class minesweepers
Ships built in Tampa, Florida
1943 ships
World War II minesweepers of the United States
Admirable-class minesweepers of the Soviet Navy
World War II minesweepers of the Soviet Union
Cold War minesweepers of the Soviet Union
Ships transferred under Project Hula